William Horton, Bill Horton, or Willie Horton may refer to:

People

Military
 William Horton (military aide) (1708–1749), British military aide
 William Charlie Horton (1876–1969), United States Marine and Medal of Honor recipient

Sport
 Bill Horton (rugby league) (1905–1992), British rugby league footballer
 Bill Horton (ice hockey) (1946–1988), retired Canadian ice hockey player
 William Horton (bobsleigh) (1897–1974), British Olympic bobsledder
 William Horton (cricketer) (1906–1986), English cricketer
 William Horton Sr. (1909–1973), American Olympic sailor
 William Horton Jr. (born 1939), American Olympic sailor
 Willie Horton (baseball) (born 1942),  American former Major League baseball player

Others
 William Horton (MP), Member of Parliament for Southwark
 William Samuel Horton (1865–1936), American impressionist painter
 Willie Horton (born 1951), convicted felon from South Carolina

Fictional characters
 Bill Horton (Days of Our Lives), fictional character on the daytime soap opera Days of our Lives
 Will Horton, fictional character on the daytime soap opera Days of our Lives